HMS Vanessa (D29) was a V-class destroyer of the British Royal Navy that was in service during World War I and World War II.

Construction and commissioning

Vanessa, the second Royal Navy ship and first major warship of the name, was ordered on 30 June 1916 as part of the 9th Order of the 1916–17 Naval Programme. She was laid down 10 May 1917 by William Beardmore and Company at Dalmuir, Scotland, and launched on 16 March 1918, christened by Mrs. Frederick Elvy. She was completed on 21 June 1918 and commissioned into service.

Service history

World War I and interwar years
Vanessa saw service in the last months of World War I, during which time she was credited with taking part in the sinking German submarine . On 27 July Vanessa was on patrol off Scarborough with a group of ASW trawlers and motor launches when the U-boat was sighted by one of the launches. After a determined search in bad weather the U-boat broached in full view of the trawler Calvia. A series of depth charges were dropped, after which oil and air bubbles were seen. The following day a headless corpse, wearing a German uniform, was recovered by Vanessa.
The war ended with the armistice with Germany on 11 November 1918. She remained in service for a time thereafter, but was decommissioned in December 1921 after serving in the Baltic during the Russian Intervention and placed in reserve at Rosyth Scotland.

World War II

Vanessa was recommissioned in 1939, and after the United Kingdom entered World War II in September 1939 was assigned to the 17th Destroyer Flotilla at Plymouth for convoy escort and patrol duties in the English Channel and the Southwestern Approaches. She continued on such duties in the Western Approaches for the rest of 1939 and in the Southwestern Approaches and English Channel from January to July 1940, but took no part in Operation Dynamo, the evacuation of Allied troops from Dunkirk, France. She and the destroyer  were escorting Convoy CW 6 in the English Channel on 13 July 1940 when it came under German air attack shortly after leaving Dover. A bomb dropped by a Junkers Ju 87 from StG 1 landed in the water six yards (5.5 meters) astern of Vanessa knocked her propellers out of service. The destroyer  towed her to port. Vanessa underwent repairs at Chatham Dockyard which were not completed until 4 November 1940.

In December 1940, Vanessa completed her post-repair acceptance trials and was selected for service in the Western Approaches. Accordingly, she reported to Western Approaches Command in January 1941 for convoy defence duty in the North Atlantic Ocean. While on patrol in the North Sea on 19 June 1941, she came under attack by German aircraft, which scored a bomb hit on her amidships. The hit made her boilers explode, blew her forward funnel overboard, killed nine ratings and wounded 17 others, two of them fatally, and caused her to go out of control and collide with the naval trawler . The destroyer  took Vanessa under tow and brought her to Great Yarmouth. She was selected in July 1941 for conversion to a long-range escort, the conversion to take place while she was under repair for her bomb damage. She entered the Green and Silley Weir Shipyard in London in August 1941 for repairs and conversion, which were not complete until the spring of 1942. While undergoing repairs and conversion, she was "adopted" by the civil community of Barry, Glamorgan, Wales, in December 1941 in a Warship Week National Savings campaign.

In October 1942 she escorted Convoy HX 213, and in early November 1942 left HX 213 to join the escort of Convoy SC 107. On 3 November 1942, she and the corvette  drove off attacks by German submarines after submarine radio transmissions were detected near SC 107.

The destroyers rescued seven members of U-357s crew.

In January 1943, Vanessa underwent repairs for structural damage, then rejoined the 2nd Escort Group. On 4 February 1943 the convoys escorts detected and responded to radio transmissions by German submarines, and the German Pfeil ("Arrow") and Haudegen ("Warhorse") submarine groups kept the convoy under attack until 9 February 1943.

Vanessa remained on North Atlantic convoy duty through the remainder of 1943, but toward the end of the year the Royal Navy selected her for withdrawal from combat service. Accordingly, she was withdrawn from service in January 1944 and from February to June 1944 underwent conversion for duty as an air target ship for use in training air crews. She entered service as a target ship in July 1944 and continued in such duties until the armistice with Japan brought World War II to an end on 15 August 1945.

Decommissioning and disposal
Later in 1945, Vanessa was decommissioned and placed in reserve. She was sold on 4 March 1947 to BISCO for scrapping and arrived at the shipbreakers yard at Charlestown, Fife, Scotland, in February 1949.

Footnote

Notes

Bibliography
 
 
 
 
 
 
Paul Kemp  : U-Boats Destroyed (1997) Arms & Armour 
 
 
 
 
 
 VE Tarrant The U-boat Offensive 1914–1945 (1989) Arms & Armour

External links
 Naval History: HMS VANESSA (D 29) - V & W-class Destroyer
 uboat.net HMS Vanessa (D 29)

 

V and W-class destroyers of the Royal Navy
Ships built on the River Clyde
1918 ships
World War I destroyers of the United Kingdom
World War II destroyers of the United Kingdom